The 2022 Pirelli GT4 America Series is the fifth season of the GT4 America Series. The season began on April 2 at Sonoma Raceway and will end on October 8 at Indianapolis Motor Speedway.

Calendar
The preliminary calendar was released on July 29, 2022, featuring 14 races across seven rounds.

Entry list

Race results
Bold indicates overall winner

References

External links

GT4 America Series
GT4 America Series
GT4 America Series